The 2014–15 Major Arena Soccer League season was the seventh season for the league and the first since six teams from the former Major Indoor Soccer League defected to what was formerly called the Professional Arena Soccer League. The regular season started on October 25, 2014, and ended on March 1, 2015. Each team played a 20-game schedule. Also it was the 37th season of professional Division 1 indoor soccer in the USA and the first season for the MASL as the top league.

Standings
As of March 1, 2015

(Bold) Division Winner

Eastern Conference

Western Conference

 Dropped out of league on December 23, 2014.
 Dropped out of league on January 15, 2015. Tacoma replaces them in the schedule.

2015 Ron Newman Cup

Playoff format
Top three finishers in each division qualify for the playoffs. The winner of the playoff between the second and third place teams will play the first place team for the division title.

In the Eastern Conference, the playoff format will be the one used in the former MISL. Each round will be a home and home series. Teams that win both games will advance. If the wins are split between the two teams, a fifteen-minute mini game will be played immediately after the second game to break the tie. In the Western Conference, the playoff format will be single elimination, which was used in the former PASL. The Ron 
Newman Cup final will use the home and home (MISL) format, including a mini game to break the tie.

Eastern Conference Playoffs

Eastern Division Semi-Final

Rochester wins series 2 games to 1.

Eastern Division Final

Central Division Semi-Final

Milwaukee wins series 2 games to 1.

Central Division Final

Eastern Conference Championship

Baltimore wins series 2 games to 0.

Western Conference Playoffs

Southern Division Semi-Final

Southern Division Final

Pacific Division Semi-Final

Pacific Division Final

Western Conference Championship

Monterrey wins series 2 games to 0.

Newman Cup Championship

Monterrey wins Newman Cup 2 games to 1.

Statistics

Top scorers
* MASL RecordLast updated on March 1, 2015. Source:

Awards

Individual Awards

All-League First Team

All-League Second Team

All-League Third Team

All-Rookie Team

References

External links
MASL official website

 
Major Arena Soccer League
Major Arena Soccer League
Major Arena Soccer League seasons